

Key

 Div 1 = Ligue 1
 Div 2 = Ligue 2

 Pld = Matches played
 W = Matches won
 D = Matches drawn
 L = Matches lost
 GF = Goals for
 GA = Goals against
 Pts = Points
 Pos = Final position

 F = Final
 SF = Semi-finals
 QF = Quarter-finals
 R16 = Round of 16
 R32 = Round of 32
 R64 = Round of 64
 R128 = Round of 128
 GS = Group stage
 PR = Preliminary round
 PO = Play-off round
 1R = First round
 2R = Second round
 3R = Third round

Seasons

Honours
Domestic 
 Ligue 1
Winners (8): 1960–61, 1962–63, 1977–78, 1981–82, 1987–88, 1996–97, 1999–2000, 2016–17
Runners-up (7): 1963–64, 1983–84, 1990–91, 1991–92, 2002–03, 2013–14, 2017–18
 Ligue 2
Winners (1): 2012–13
Runners-up (3): 1952–53, 1970–71, 1976–77 
 Coupe de France
Winners (5): 1959–60, 1962–63, 1979–80, 1984–85, 1990–91
Runners-up (5): 1973–74, 1983–84, 1988–89, 2009–10, 2020–21
 Coupe de la Ligue
Winners (1): 2002–03
Runners-up (3): 2000–01, 2016–17, 2017–18
 Trophée des Champions
Winners (4): 1961, 1985, 1997, 2000
Runners-up (3): 1960, 2017, 2018

European
 UEFA Champions League
Runners-up (1): 2003–04
 UEFA Cup Winners' Cup
Runners-up (1): 1991–92

Seasons
 
Monaco
AS Monaco FC seasons